South Uniacke is a small community in the Canadian province of Nova Scotia, located in  The Municipality of the District of East Hants in Hants County.

References
South Uniacke on Destination Nova Scotia

Communities in Hants County, Nova Scotia
General Service Areas in Nova Scotia